Pinagsama, is an administrative division in Metro Manila, the Philippines. It is an urban barangay located in the western portion of Taguig City.

From a thriving community of mixed residential and commercial developments along Circumferential Road 5 (C5), the area has become an important residential, commercial and industrial center in Taguig, and is the second most populated barangay in the city.

The McKinley Hill development adjacent to Bonifacio Global City can be found in the barangay, as well as the Arca South mixed-use development.

It is bordered by the barangays of Fort Bonifacio to the north, Central Signal Village to the southeast, North Signal Village to the east, Ususan on the northeast and Western Bicutan on the west and southwest. Pinagsama Creek, a tributary of the Taguig River cuts through the northern half of Pinagsama and Ususan.

History
Barangay Pinagsama was split from Barangay Western Bicutan by virtue of Taguig City Ordinance No. 67 Series of 2008 dated September 15, 2008.  The name was conceived by the adjoining existence of territorial villages of Wildcat Village, 16th ISU Village, ISG Central Village, G2 Village, Upper West Village, PANAM Village, PALAR Village, Pinagsama Village Phase 1 and Phase 2, AFP EP Village Phase 1 and Phase 2, Heritage Park, Parcel of the Inner-Fort Bonifacio and McKinley Hill.  

An official plebiscite was held in Barangay Western Bicutan on December 18, 2008 with an overwhelming majority in favor for the creation of the new barangay. The first set of barangay officials were appointed by then-mayor, Sigfrido R. Tiñga on April 4, 2009.

ROLANDO B. REGALADO  		  Punong Barangay

 MA. VICTORIA M. MORTEL     	 Brgy. Kagawad
  
 RACHIEL ANN R. AZARCON 	  Brgy. Kagawad
 
 JOVILIZA GAYLE E. MERCA	    Brgy. Kagawad
 		
 FELIX  W. ANGGACO		           Brgy. Kagawad
 		
 EMMANUEL CLEMENTE		      Brgy. Kagawad
 		
 ISABEL M. MORTEL		             SK Chairman

-Jomil Bryan Serna
SK Kagawad

-Simon Jude Miñoza
SK Kagawad

-Marlon Tugada
SK Kagawad

-Ana Romina Marmol
SK Kagawad

-Joanne Veloria
SK Kagawad

-Hazel Guillermo
SK Kagawad		
		
		
The above-named officials held office up to November 30, 2010 and subsequent assumption into office of the First Elected Barangay Officials after the Nationwide Barangay and SK Elections last October 25, 2010, with the following duly elected barangay officials sworn into office effective December 1, 2010 to December 1, 2013:

	PUNONG BARANGAY		JESUS S. MERILO †

	BARANGAY KAGAWAD 	

 MA. VICTORIA M. MORTEL- BALIDOY				
 
 RACHIEL ANN R. AZARCON			
 
 JOVILIZA GAYLE E. MERCA				
 
 JULITA S. QUIÑONES				
 
 FELIX  W. ANGGACO				
 
 FELIX “JOJO” L. MOJADO				
 
 GLENN C. SACAY			

	SK CHAIRMAN			BERNARDO “NONOY” M. MORTEL III

	SK KAGAWAD			

 JOHN PAUL R. AZARCON
 					
 JOMIL BRYAN C. SERNA
 					
 GEMMALYN GONZALES
 					
 MARLON V. TUGADE
 
 RHEENA P. ESPIRITU
                                        
 AMILLE RHIETH F. MADIA
                                        
 PAULA MARIE A.  REYES

BARANGAY PINAGSAMA UNDER THE ADMINISTRATION OF PUNONG BARNAGAY NOMIES. VELORIA AND THE 4TH SANGGUNIANG BARANGAY

The following names are new Brgy. Pinagsama officials who held office on June 30, 2018 after being elected during the Barangay Elections in the Philippines on May 14, 2018.

PUNONG BARANGAY: 
NOMIE S. VELORIA

BRGY. KAGAWAD:      
 SUSAN C. AQUINO             
 RACHIEL ANN R. AZARCON      
 ROMUALDO T. GAMET, MPM      
 PRUDENCIO A. CUARESMA       
 ROMEO C. RUADO              
 JULITA S. QUIÑONES          
 FELIX W. ANGGACO

Elections for the reformed Sangguniang Kabataan (SK; youth councils) were also held at the same date and it was the first SK elections since 2010.  Following names are the SK officials in Brgy. Pinagsama:

SK CHAIRMAN: 
JOMIL BRYAN SERNA(2018-2020)

JOVYANN B. MABUNGA

SK KAGAWAD:
 MARK ABELLA
 ALBERT CRUZ
 NANETTE AMONGOL
 JOMARIE LAGGUI
 AMILLE MADIA
 JEREMY HUBAHIB

Barangay Pinagsama: The International Gateway of Taguig City 

Barangay Pinagsama is home to the Venice Grand Canal Mall, British Embassy, Korean Embassy, Embassy of the State of Qatar and the Embassy of UAE, International Schools and Colleges located in McKinley Hill. It has been called "The International Gateway of Taguig City".

The Creation of Barangay Pinagsama 

Accordingly, Barangay Pinagsama having satisfied all requisites for creation into a new barangay, with an initial population of 32,777 based on the survey of the National Statistics Office (NSO) as of Year 2008; with its appropriate territorial Jurisdiction defined by permanent natural boundaries as approved. A technical description of the newly constituted Barangay Pinagsama is as shown:

GEOGRAPHY:

A.	Boundaries

North:	          	 American Battle Monument (Manila American Cemetery)

East  :	          	 Pres. Carlos P. Garcia (C-5), Diego Silang (BCDA)

South East:   	         Palakol Area (BCDA), Former  Brgy. Signal Village (Now North Signal Village)

North & North West :      American Battle Monument and M.R.T. Ave. (Bayani Road)

South & South West :      M.R.T. Ave., Pres. Carlos P. Garcia (C-5), Proclamation #172 Western Bicutan and Veterans Center Area.

B.	Land area of villages and private territories:

1.	AFP EP Village				38.5 	Hectares

2.	7 Villages (BHIT) Zone			59.2  	Hectares

3.	Heritage Park				70	Hectares

4.	McKinley Hill				50	Hectares	

5.	Pinagsama Village 1 & 2			30.7	Hectares
 
DEMOGRAPHY

1.	Total Population					57,343   (2015)	

2.	Total Nos. of Household	  	  		25,562   (2015)	

3.	Total Nos. of Registered Voters	  		30,224   (2016)	

4.	Total Nos. of Voting Precinct			72	

5.	Senior Citizens (60 year old and above)  		1500	  (2016)

Barangay Services 
			1. Peace and Order

				a. Barangay Security Force and Peace Makers
				b. Telephone Operator Hotline # 553 9170

			2. Barangay Pinagsama Disaster Risk Reduction and Management

		a. Barangay Pinagsama Fire and Rescue Team
		b. Ambulance and Medic

	3. Monitoring and Security Facilities
		
		a. 24/7 CCTV Cameras
		b. Public Address System

Educational Institutions 

A. Public Basic Education Schools

      1.Kapitan Eddie T. Reyes Integrated School 		Pinagsama Village Phase 2
      2.PALAR Integrated School				        PALAR Village
      3.Western Bicutan National High School 		        EP Village Phase 1

B. Private Basic Education Schools
		
       1.D’ Carmelite School					EP Village Phase 1
       2.Merry Mount Preparatory School			        EP Village Phase 1
       3.EP Ville Integrated Academy				EP Village Phase 1
       4.Academia de San Isidro					EP Village Phase 1
       5.Progressive Christian Academy				EP Village Phase 1
       6.Gabby's Christian School				EP Village Phase 1
       7.Promise land Baptist Learning School			EP Village Phase 1
       8.God's Grace Christian Academy				EP Village Phase 2
       9.Army's Angels Integrated School			        EP Village Phase 2
       10.Spring of Kerith Montessori School			EP Village Phase 2
       11.St. Andre Academy					Pinagsama Village Ph1
       12.Geres Academy of Taguig				Pinagsama Village Ph1
       13.Eastern Achiever Academy of Taguig			Pinagsama Village Ph1
       14.Morning Glory Christian Academy			Pinagsama Village Ph2
       15. God's Grace Christian Academy				Pinagsama Village Ph2
       16.St. Bernard Academy of Taguig				Pinagsama Village Ph2
       17.Our Lady of Snow Excel School				Pinagsama Village Ph2
       18.Bloomfield Academy of Makati				Pinagsama Village Ph2
       19.Mary Lourdes Academy					Pinagsama Village Ph2
       20.Balmor Christian School                                Pinagsama Village Ph2
       21.Phil. Army Officers Ladies Foundation School		Bayani Road
       22.Abba's Orchard Montessori School			McKinley Hill
       23.Taguig Christian Learning School                       G2 Village

C. Tertiary Educational Institutions

1. The Fisher Valley College		Pinagsama Village Phase 2

2. Enderun Colleges			McKinley Hill

3. MINT College	McKinley Hill

D. International Schools

	1. Korean International School	McKinley Hill

	2. Chinese International School	McKinley Hill

Foreign embassies

There are four (4) foreign embassies located in Barangay Pinagsama:

	1. Embassy of the Republic of Korea

	2. Embassy of the State of Qatar

	3. Embassy of the United Arab Emirates

	4. Embassy of the United Kingdom of Great Britain and Northern Ireland

Administration of A. Victoria M. Mortel-Balidoy

In the October 2013 Barangay Elections, Ma. Victoria M. Mortel-Balidoy or “Vic Mortel” was decisively elected Barangay Captain over five (5) other opponents for the position. Seven (7) Members of the council who won in the said elections were:

1. Rachiel Ann R. Azarcon (Re-elected)

2. Nomie S. Veloria (Retired Police)

3. Susan C. Aquino (Former City Social Worker)

4. Jomil Bryan C. Serna (Former Sangguniang Kabataan Kagawad)

5. Romualdo T. Gamet (Retired Military)

6. Felix W. Anggaco (Re-elected/Retired Military)

7. Joviliza Gayle E. Merca (Re-elected)

They were sworn into office on November 27, 2013 before Taguig City Mayor Ma. Laarni L. Cayetano and assumed the office on December 1, 2013 which was also the start of the 3rd Barangay Council of Pinagsama.

The third barangay council focuses on the upliftment of the barangay economy and of its populace as a result of inclusive governance. That includes partnering with the business community of McKinley Hill and Bonifacio Global City, providing livelihood programs, job opportunities, feeding program, youth and sports development projects, environmental cleanliness, supporting childhood education through Early Childhood Care and Development Centers and maintaining peace and order.
Since June 2016, upon the assumption of Rodrigo Duterte as President of the Philippines, the Barangay Government of Pinagsama has been actively compliant to the President's campaign to fight against illegal drugs in the community. 
In December 2016, Taguig City Police awarded Barangay Pinagsama as one of the most outstanding barangays in relation to “Oplan Tokhang”.

Barangay Pinagsama is in strong partnership with the City Government of Taguig when it comes to infrastructure projects, social services and peace and order. Likewise, as part of the council's vision to include the business community in the development of our Barangay, they also created networks with the stakeholders of McKinley Hill and Bonifacio Global City for possible partnership projects such as Corporate-Social Responsibility (CSR) and Community Service Activities.

A livelihood training center was also established to empower our people through trainings on reducing garbage and producing reusable hand-made crafts from the recyclable materials.

Although Barangay Pinagsama faces a bright future for the rising businesses within its jurisdiction, some public service projects are hindered by its greatest present challenge which is the absence of Internal Revenue Allotment (IRA)- Barangay share of revenues from the national government. There are several reasons why Pinagsama has no IRA yet; First, Barangay Pinagsama is a newly created Barangay; second, Barangay Pinagsama is one of the barangays affected by the territorial dispute of Makati vs. Taguig thus a status quo order of the higher court pertaining the territorial dispute hampers the legislation for the creation of a law creating Barangay Pinagsama providing its share from the national revenue. For the time being, the Barangay Government's source of fund relies on its miscellaneous income on barangay business permits, barangay clearance, user charges on barangay facilities, city aid and share from the real property tax (RPT) from the city government.

As of 2018, the Barangay Government has a total of Two Hundred Seventy Eight (278) Employees composed of Brgy Officials, Employees & Admin Staffs, Zone Leaders, Purok Leaders, Drivers, Mediators, Lupong Tagapamayapa, Barangay Security Force, Traffic Enforcers, Peace Makers & Volunteers, Brgy. Health Workers, Day Care Teachers and Utility Personnel.

Mission, vision and goals

VISION:

We envision an esteemed and stable barangay of dynamic  leadership, perfectly acquainted of their duties and responsibilities in command of a responsive local government,  exhibiting  respectful attitude to duly constituted authorities, with moral ascendancy to lead, guided with godly conduct on virtues of  harmonious relationship amongst constituent,  morality and integrity as  concrete example   of concern, assuming more active roles in providing basic public and  social services, towards  attainment of a stable political, social and economic environment, imperative of people in pursuit to fulfillment of mutual goals and common aspirations.

MISSION:

To achieve this vision, we fully commit ourselves to our common shared aspirations adopting changes on our present state of affairs in our community, upgrading and enhancing quality of local leadership:

 To respect and zealously safeguard rights or freedom of individuals in the community, ability to do whatever is right within the bounds of the law and participate as individual contributors to community development  as such establishing barangay satellite offices in Area of responsibility.
 To enhance barangay officials leadership empowerment such as it articulate their aspiration to contribute in drawing-up  their agenda, asserts their right to good governance plans,  which may enhance effective employment of development at barangay satellite offices.
 To strengthen the different stake holders of Barangay Pinagsama and be aware of their roles in accelerating economic development and level-up the quality of their life and ensure their active corroboration and trust to our local officials and law enforcers.
 To preserve judicious and rightly use of power among leaders towards a fair justice system in the community with their acts are within their prescribed scope of power and functions.
 Discipline and integrity be cultivated, godly conduct with ethical values be preserved.
 To vigorously work towards safety of the barangay populace with peace and order a primary main concern. Campaign aggregated support of all constituents as active partners in local peace autonomy.
 Endeavor to promote youth development through sports development.

GOALS:

1. Develop a strong, well-managed and secured Barangay Pinagsama through good governance, of accountability, efficiency in implementing its functional organizational structure,  attending to priority needs of the community.

2. Achieve sustainable development of its primordial plans and projects, specifically:
 
   a. construction of  Barangay Satellite Offices in all Zones

   b. roads networks and street developments

   c. construction of community parks

   d. development of drainage and creeks or flood water ways system.

3. Electrification connection and potable water linkages for villages without Meralco  and established NGOS for capability building and livelihood projects that helps economic and social wellbeing of the populace.

4. Actively support all programs, projects of the city and national government that addresses the enhanced plight of our populace.

Official seal

1.	THE GOLDEN SHIELD IN A BLUE BACKGROUND

The shield represents the protection that the Barangay Government gives to its constituents.

The gold color of the shield represents the genuine leadership of the barangay government in all corners of the community. The royal blue represents wisdom and peace.

2.	THE PEOPLE

The first part of the quadrant represents a family that is bonded as one for the community.

3.	THE BUSINESSES AND THE ELEVEN ZONES

The second part of the quadrant represents the businesses and the eleven zones of the barangay. The Venice Piazza Tower is present in the seal recognized as the most famous landmark of the Barangay.

The three rectangles in different sizes represent the small and big enterprises in Pinagsama. It also represents all the rising infrastructures in the community.

The industry icon “gear” with eleven (11) spikes represents the eleven zones of the barangay namely:

Zone 1- AFP EP Village Phase 1

Zone 2- AFP EP Village Phase 2

Zone 3- Pinagsama Village Phase 1

Zone 4- Pinagsama Village Phase 2

Zone 5- PANAM Village

Zone 6- ISG Central Village

Zone 7- Upperwest Village

Zone 8- G2 Village

Zone 9- 16th ISU Village

Zone 10- Wildcat Village

Zone 11- PALAR Village

4.	THE C.P. GARCIA AVENUE AND THE ENVIRONMENT

The highway icon represents the Circumferential 5 Road (C.P. Garcia Avenue) which plays a big role in the barangay's progress. It is also one of the major thoroughfares in Metro Manila making Pinagsama a gateway to progress.

The trees symbolize the importance of the environment in the development of the barangay. The four trees represent the four elements of nature namely: Earth, Water, Fire and Air.

5.	THE WEIGHING SCALE AND THE LAUREL WREATH

The weighing scale symbolizes justice. The Barangay Government is always just and fair to all. 
The laurel wreath symbolizes victory in justice and governance.

6.	THE YEAR BARANGAY PINAGSAMA WAS ESTABLISHED

Also indicated in the seal is “2009” the year Barangay Pinagsama was established.

7.	BARANGAY PINAGSAMA CITY OF TAGUIG IN ROYAL BLUE  FONT COLOR

Barangay Pinagsama City of Taguig in Royal Blue font color represents peace, passion and power.

8.	THE ICONS IN WHITE COLOR

The icons in white color represent purity, goodness and success.

9.	THE THREE GOLDEN STARS AND THE GOLDEN LINE

The three stars symbolize Discipline, Public Service and Excellence. 
The gold line symbolizes stability in governance.

Officials of the Third Barangay Council (2013-Present) 

Chairman: Ma. Victoria M. Mortel-Balidoy

Sangguniang Barangay Members

Brgy. Councilor Rachiel Ann R. Azarcon

Brgy. Councilor Nomie S. Veloria

Brgy. Councilor Jomil Bryan C. Serna,MPM

Brgy. Councilor Susan C. Aquino

Brgy. Councilor Romualdo T. Gamet,MPM

Brgy. Councilor Felix W. Anggaco

Brgy. Councilor Joviliza Gayle E. Merca

APPOINTED OFFICIALS

Brgy. Secretary Martin M. Balunos

Brgy. Treasurer Sonia B. Aguilar

Brgy. Administrator Maria Diosabellee B. Abella

References 

Barangays of Metro Manila
Taguig